The Jerome Park Reservoir is a reservoir located in Jerome Park, a neighborhood in the North Bronx, New York City. The reservoir is surrounded by DeWitt Clinton High School, the Bronx High School of Science, Lehman College, and Walton High School.

History

The reservoir was built in 1906 to serve the New Croton aqueduct as part of the New York City water supply system. It is named for Jerome Park Racetrack, a part of the former Old Bathgate Estate (owned by Winston Churchill's maternal grandfather Leonard Walter Jerome 1817–1891, for whom the racetrack was originally named) which opened in 1866 and which was the site of the inaugural Belmont Stakes in 1867. The racetrack was condemned, bought by New York City and closed in 1889 to make way for the reservoir.

In 1996, residents organized under the leadership of Jerome Park Conservancy to stop the city from converting the site to a water treatment plant. It was thought that the noise, chemicals, and unsightly construction would decrease the quality of life for area residents, and have a negative impact on the learning environment at nearby schools.

The reservoir was listed on the National Register of Historic Places in 2000. The related High Pumping Station had been listed in 1983.

The treatment plant was built in another part of the North Bronx underneath Van Cortlandt Park. In connection with this work, the Croton system was taken offline and the reservoir emptied in December 2008. It was refilled and returned to service in early 2014.  In November 2015, the DEP experimentally opened the perimeter to the public for tours.

References

External links
Jerome Park, at New York City Department of Parks and Recreation
Jerome Park Reservoir, Bronx, Kadinsky, Sergey Hidden Waters Blog January 5, 2017

Historic districts on the National Register of Historic Places in the Bronx
Reservoirs in New York (state)
Water infrastructure of New York City
Water supply infrastructure on the National Register of Historic Places
Art Deco architecture in the Bronx
Protected areas of the Bronx
Infrastructure completed in 1906
Jerome Park, Bronx
Lakes of the Bronx
1906 establishments in New York City